Lakkundi, also referred to as Lokkugundi, was a major city prior to the 14th-century, and is now a village in Gadag District of Karnataka, India. By 10th-century, it was already a major economic and commerce center with mint operations for South India, one mentioned in Kannada and Sanskrit inscriptions and texts. By 12th-century, a galaxy of Hindu and Jain temples had been consecrated here, along with public infrastructure such as step wells and water reservoirs. Among the major temples are the Brahma Jinalaya (oldest), Mallikarjuna, Lakshminarayana, Manikeshwara, Naganatha, Kumbheshvara, Nanneshwara, Someshwara, Narayana, Nilakanteshwara, Kasivisesvara (most sophisticated, ornate), Virabhadhara, Virupaksha, and others. As its importance and wealth grew, Lakkundi became one of the capitals of the Hoysalas.

In and after the 14th-century, it was one of the cities targeted by Islamic Sultanates as they sought loot and political dominance over the South Indian Hindu kingdoms. The British archaeologists of the 19th-century rediscovered Lakkundi and its significance, found well over 50 temple ruins spread around a small village of Lakkundi, all in filthy condition with some hosting colonies of bats. Ruins from Lakkundi now highlight the history of Indian Art in museums. The major Lakkundi temples have now been restored, with some ruins displayed in a local sculpture gallery (museum) and sheds near the temples. These are maintained by the ASI (Archaeological Survey of India). Lakkundi is one of the most important centers for the study of Kalyana Chalukya era Hindu architecture, the so-called Lakkundi-school of architects and craftsmen. Other than Hindu and Jain monuments, a Muslim dargah dedicated to Zindeshah Wali is also found here.

Location

Lakkundi is about 12 kilometers from the twin city of Gadag-Betageri, between Hampi and Goa, connected by India's National Highway 67. A home to numerous ruins of historic Hindu and Jain temples, Lakkundi is geographically located in a region with many major temple groups from the Kalachuris, Chalukyas, Yadavas-Seunas, Hoysalas and Vijayanagara era. For example, it is close to historic temples found in Dambal, Kukkanur, Gadag, Annigeri, Mulgund, Harti, Laksmesvara, Kalkeri, Savadi, Hooli, Rona, Sudi, Koppal, and Itagi. The nearest Railway station is in Gadag city.

History 

Lakkundi is phonetically shortened name of the historic city of Lokkigundi, a name found in inscriptions in the village and those quite far in southern Karnataka and Maharashtra. The earliest surviving inscription was discovered by British archaeologists on a stone slab near Kanner Bhanvi – a step well in Lakkundi. The inscribed stone slab was being used by local dhobis (laundry washerman) to wash clothes at the step well. The inscription on it dates to 790 CE. This inscription confirms that Lakkundi was already in existence and significant enough for an inscription by the 8th-century. James Fergusson – the 19th-century Scottish historian known for his archaeological and architectural studies in India, reported over 30 more inscriptions from Lakkundi, in Kannada and Sanskrit, most of which range between the 11th and 12th century. Some of these were foundation stone inscriptions of Jain and Hindu temples, others gifts to different temples, to Maha-agrahara, to monasteries such as Hiree Matha (now lost), to donate step wells for the public and pilgrims, and other purposes. Though damaged, many of them include the Saka year of the inscription. The profusion of these inscriptions attests to the importance of Lakkundi as a historic city to both Hindu and Jain traditions.

Many more inscriptions on stone and copper plates mentioning Lokkugundi have been discovered far from Lakkundi. However, in this part of ancient and medieval Karnataka, Lokkugundi is among the most mentioned cities. By 1884, some thirty five Hindu and Jain inscriptions dated to between the 9th and 13th-century CE had been found that mention Lokkugundi. Though Lakkundi was an established town in the second half of the 1st millennium, its growth and wealth came after 973 CE when Taila II, a Chalukya of Vatapi descendant and chieftain appointed in 965 CE, organized a successful revolt against Karkka II of the Rashtrakuta dynasty. In regional texts, the reign that followed is called Cālukya (Later Chalukyas, Kalyani Chalukyas, or Chalukyas of Kalyana) to distinguish them from the Calukya (Early Chalukyas). Lakkundi flowered and grew with the Shiva-tradition Hindu monarch Satyasraya Irivabedanga – the successor and son of Taila II who came to power in 997 or 998 CE. This is attested by both Jain and Hindu inscriptions of early 11th-century, particularly of a woman named Attimabbe who gets permission from Satyasraya to build her Jaina temple, which she did and which is now the oldest surviving Brahma Jinalaya temple in Lakkundi.

Lakkundi grew to be a major city, prosperous and one with a mint. Lakkundi and several historic towns to its north – such as Rona, Sudi, Kradugu now known as Gadag, Hooli and others – attracted a burst of religious, cultural and literary flowering from the 11th to 13th century, with ever more sophisticated temple architectures, Vidyadana (charity supported schools) and public works such as step wells. These are largely in the context of Shaivism and Jainism, though a few major temples of Vaishnavism here are also from this period. 

Smaller Lakkundi monuments can be traced to the Kalachuris, the short rule here of the Seunas and the longer rule of the Hoysalas. In 1192 CE, after many of the remarkable temples of Lakkundi were already standing, a Sanskrit inscription of Hoysala king Ballala II re-affirms the continued importance of Lakkundi and it becoming his capital. After the 13th-century, there is an abrupt end to all evidence of new public works, temples, inscriptions and other indirect signs of economic prosperity in Lakkundi.

Temples 
Lakkundi has about 50 temples and temple ruins of different sizes and sophistication, all dated to pre-14th century. They are of Shaivism, Jainism and Vaishnavism, though most temples include diverse iconography such as Surya and of Vedic deities such as Brahma. For example, the oldest Jaina temple – Brahma Jinalaya – includes Hindu statues and artworks such as that of 4-headed Brahma, Saraswati and Lakshmi, along with Mahavira, Parsvanatha and other Tirthankaras. The major surviving temples in Lakkundi include:

Step wells 

Lakkundi has a number of step wells, some functioning as water tanks for the temples. These are artistically built with small canopied niches enshrining lingas. The Chateer Bavi, Kanne Bavi and Musukina Bavi are architecturally significant and popular for their artwork and carvings.

Inscriptions 

Over two dozen Kannada and Sanskrit inscriptions from different Hindu dynasties have been found at Lakkundi. These describe gifts and donations, donor names and which social classes these donors came from, the ritual and cultural aspects of their times and the socio-political contexts of medieval era Karnataka. Some of these are important to help establish the Jain heritage in Karnataka during these Hindu dynasties. Some of these include:
 The inscriptions of the Kalyani Chalukyas king Irive Bedanga narrates in Ajithanatha Purana the details of the construction of the Brahma Jinalaya by Attimabbe and the donations.
 The inscriptions of the Kalachuris of Kalyani King Sovideva (1173 A.D.) reveals the donation of gold to a Basadi by Gunanidi Keshava.
 The important inscriptions of Kalyani Chalukyas Somashekara VI (1185 A.D.), reveals the donation for conducting Ashtavidharchana. Another 12th-century  inscription mentions the donation of land to Tribhuvana tilaka Shantinatha. Also an inscription mentions the existence of Jain saints Mulasangha Devanga.

Tourism 
Lakkundi is known for Chalukya style temples, stepped wells and historic inscriptions. Lakkundi is often a gem missed by a majority of tourists. If you take the trouble to visit Lakkundi, you will be rewarded with one of the finest architectural feasts of the Kalyana Chalukya period (c. 10th century CE).

Gallery

See also

Architecture References 
 Western Chalukya architecture
 Hindu temple architecture
 Hoysala architecture
 Vijayanagara architecture
 Badami Chalukya architecture
 Dravidian architecture

References 

11. LAKKUNDIY BRAMAJINALAY : VASTU-SHILP-SHASAN (2014, Dr. Appanna N. Hanje, Vidyashre Prakashan, ALAGAWADI-591317
12. LAKKUNDIY BASADIGALU (2015), Dr. Appanna N. Hanje, Vidyashre Prakashan, ALAGAWADI-591317
13. SAMAVASARAN (Research Articles-2015), Dr. Appanna N. Hanje, Vidyashre Prakashan, ALAGAWADI-591317

External links 
 Marvels of Lakkundi
 Kalyani Chalukya Architecture

Archaeological sites in Karnataka
Villages in Gadag district
Former capital cities in India
Tourism in Karnataka
Cities and towns in Gadag district
History of Karnataka
Chalukya dynasty
Rashtrakuta dynasty
Western Chalukya Empire